Roffey Road Halt is a now disused station on the Arun Valley Line in West Sussex, England  and was the second station north from Horsham on the stretch to Crawley. It occupied a rural setting and opened on 1 June 1907. The anticipated housing growth did not occur and it closed in 1937. Some associated cottages were demolished in the early 1970s. The only visible signs of its existence are a number of concrete posts that supported the platforms. 

It is likely that the site and associated land next to the old station will be developed in the 2020s. A large housing estate of 2700 houses and a new park and ride railway station at this site have been approved.

Further bibliography 

Gray, Adrian, The Railways of Mid-Sussex, Oakwood Press (1975)
Mitchell, Vic; Keith Smith (1986). Southern Main Lines: Crawley to Littlehampton. Midhurst: Middleton Press.  ISBN 0-906520-34-7.

References 

Disused railway stations in West Sussex
Railway stations in Great Britain opened in 1907
Railway stations in Great Britain closed in 1917
Railway stations in Great Britain opened in 1920
Railway stations in Great Britain closed in 1937
Former London, Brighton and South Coast Railway stations